Guy Édoin is a Canadian film director and screenwriter, whose debut full-length film Wetlands (Marécages) was released in 2011.

Originally from Saint-Armand, Quebec, Édoin studied at the Université du Québec à Montréal and the Université de Montréal. He previously wrote and directed the short films The Bridge (Le Pont) in 2004, The Dead Water (Les Eaux mortes) in 2006 and Beyond the Walls (La Battue) in 2008. All three films received Prix Jutra nominations for Best Short Film, with The Dead Water winning, and Beyond the Walls received a Genie Award nomination for Best Live Action Short Drama.

His second feature film, Ville-Marie, was released in 2015.

Édoin, who is gay, predominantly addresses LGBT themes in his work.

He began shooting the film Frontiers (Frontières) in fall 2021.

Filmography
The Bridge (Le Pont) - 2004
The Dead Water (Les Eaux mortes) - 2006
Beyond the Walls (La Battue) - 2008
Wetlands (Marécages) - 2011
Corno - 2013
Ville-Marie - 2015
Malek - 2019
Frontiers (Frontières) - 2023

References

External links

Canadian screenwriters in French
Film directors from Quebec
People from Saint-Armand, Quebec
Gay screenwriters
LGBT film directors
French Quebecers
Living people
Canadian gay writers
Canadian LGBT screenwriters
21st-century Canadian screenwriters
Canadian male screenwriters
Year of birth missing (living people)
21st-century Canadian LGBT people